Miran Bukhsh was the elder son of Ebraheem bin Qutab Din and was great-grandson of Abdul Aziz Mughal. He had three sons, Siraj Din, Pir Bukhsh and Roshan Din. Genealogy records owned by Muhammad Aslam Mughal, currently held in Langrewali, a small village of Sialkot, shows that Miran Bukhsh lived in that district.

Genealogy

References

Uyghurs